Princess of the Stars may refer to:

,  a ferry owned by Filipino shipping company Sulpicio Lines that sank on June 22, 2008
The Princess of the Stars, an experimental opera or music drama by R. Murray Schafer
La Princesse des Étoiles (literally "The Princess of the Stars"), a French release title for Nausicaä of the Valley of the Wind.